The TLC 2016 Tour  was a concert tour of American group TLC. The tour covered the United States, Canada, Japan, Philippines, Australia and New Zealand. The set list of the shows in 2016 included songs from all four studio albums of TLC's career. The tour comes as the duo plan to release a new album - their first in more than 14 years.

Concert synopsis
The tour comes as the duo plan to release a new album - their first in more than 14 years.

"We always look to her in the shows and pay tribute to Lisa when we do " Waterfalls". The energy she had was something we loved about her so much, everyone did. People end up smiling, laughing, crying - it's a whole range of emotions. I feel her spirit."

Watkins said she was looking forward to performing in New Zealand, and TLC were making the trip largely because of the demand from "amazing" fans. "On Twitter they are always hitting me up, saying 'when are you going to come down?"

Both Tionne, "T-Boz" Watkins and Rozonda, "Chilli" Thomas performed together as a duo, while using some samples of Lisa "Left-Eye" Lopes's performances.

Set list
"What About Your Friends"
"Ain't 2 Proud 2 Beg"
"Silly Ho"
"Kick Your Game"
"Hat 2 Da Back"
"Baby-Baby-Baby"
"Diggin' on You"
"Red Light Special"
"Creep"
"FanMail"
"I'm Good at Being Bad"
"Damaged"
"Unpretty"
"No Scrubs"
"Meant To Be"
"Waterfalls"

Tour dates

Cancellations and rescheduled shows

Personnel
TLC – performers
Benny Demus – DJ
Mike Williams – keyboards and MIDI
Leon Kitrell II – drums
Jamaica Craft – choreographer
Naeemah McCowan – dancer
Maasa Ishihara – dancer
Gabriel Graves – dancer
Victor Carter – dancer

References

2016 concert tours
TLC (group) concert tours